Flexible stone veneer is a veneer with a layer of stone 1 to 5 mm thick. Flexible stone veneers should not be confused with traditional stone veneer. It is used for both interior and exterior and especially where bending to a curved surface is required. Flexible stone veneers are made from various types of slate, schist, or marble.

Flexible stone is an innovative material and such a  great alternative to heavy stone and paint. It is made of natural marble chips and an acrylic aqueous dispersion. The stone can be applied on any wall: concrete, masonry, wallboard, metal, plywood and drywall and can be glued on any cementitious adhesives.  It is used for finishing various types of facades, balconies, garages, columns, fireplaces, and restaurants.

Manufacture

 

Flexible stone veneer is made from a thin layer of stone stripped or peeled from a metamorphic stone marble chips or slab, rather than cutting from a solid stone or precast composite material. Thin veneers (from .5mm to 2mm thick) of slate, schist, or sandstone (metamorphic rocks) are pulled away from the original thicker stone slabs by adhering a thin layer of fiberglass/polyester resin composite backing. There is no grinding of the surface to make it thinner. When the resins cure the composite is "pulled" or "stripped" away from taking with it the thin layer of stone. This process only works with layered rock and marble but not with granite. There are many companies around the world manufacturing it, major companies like Stone Sheets United States, StoneArch Inc. Canada, etc.

Sustainability
Flexible stone veneers are more sustainable building materials because they only use the top layer of stone. This means that a thick slab of slate can reveal hundreds of layers of stone while leaving much of the stone for future generations. Processing this new material also reduces scrap because requiring tons of stone to be quarried, transported, mined, or processed is not necessary. Less fuel is used before and after processing this material because of its light weight. Additionally, in a single crate hundreds of square meters of material can be transported where traditional stone products would require larger trucks and equipment to move and handle the raw slabs.

However, since the backing is made out of fiberglass/polyester resin composite and is permanently attached to the stone layer, it is practically impossible to recycle or reuse the material. It is also significantly less durable than a regular stone surface.

Material characteristics

Flexible stone veneer varies in thickness, color, and texture and will generally carry color and texture from the original stone it is pulled from. The processed stone sheets are similar to the original slab and can vary widely from another similar stone of the same type.  As the materials are made from real stone slabs and marble with an acrylic,   each layer varies as well the texture of each sheet has a unique finish.

History
Flexible stone veneers were first created by accident in 1995 when the slate furniture designer Gernot Ehrlich of Germany found that when resins used to bond slate tiles were removed from a broken table top, a remaining stone skin, or veneer, of the original stone was left attached to the resin. After many years of research and development the process was perfected to an entire new series of veneer products. These materials are now produced worldwide and used for flooring, cabinet fronts, door skins, wall covering, columns, furniture, and wherever a flexible real stone look is desired.

Standard application
Applications of flexible stone veneers include: backsplashes, window sills, residential flooring, ceilings, walls, columns, curved surfaces, furniture, light weight signage, lighting, shower and bath remodeling or new installations.

Installation
Installing flexible stone veneers is typically done by cutting the sheet using long nose tin snips and then adhering to a substrate using various adhesives. Because the flexible stone veneer sheets are waterproof they can be used in most wet locations. These materials hold up to most indoor/outdoor environments other than extreme low freezing conditions. Like real stone, these flexible stone veneers can also be sealed using wood or stone sealers to bond and protect the surface while bringing out the colors.

References 

Building stone
Stonemasonry
Wallcoverings